Events in the year 1935 in Norway.

Incumbents
 Monarch – Haakon VII
 Prime Minister – Johan Ludwig Mowinckel (Liberal Party) until 20 March, Johan Nygaardsvold (Labour Party)

Popular culture

Sports

Music

Film

Du har lovet mig en kone!, starring Einar Sissener, directed by Tancred Ibsen

Literature
Nordahl Grieg – Vår ære og vår makt

Births

January to March
5 January – Jan Paulsen, President of the General Conference of Seventh-day Adventists
7 January – Olav Holt, physicist
13 January – Svein Aasmundstad, civil servant
22 January – Gunnar Høst Sjøwall, tennis player and photographer
26 January – Tore Bernitz Pedersen, illustrator and comics artist (died 2015).
6 February – Peter Angelsen, politician and Minister
9 February – Odd Kvaal Pedersen, journalist, author and translator (died 1990)
10 February – Gunnar Stålsett, bishop and politician
6 March – Helge Tverberg, mathematician
20 March – Arne Kotte, footballer (died 2015)
28 March – Paula Nordhus, politician (died 1994)

April to June

6 April – Harald Tusberg, television personality
8 April – Tore Austad, politician and Minister
13 April – Thorbjørn Berntsen, politician and Minister
15 April – Jens Erik Fenstad, mathematician
20 April – Oddbjørn Sverre Langlo, politician (died 2004)
1 May – Arve Berg, politician
15 May – Hans Petter Lundgaard, jurist
15 May – Odd Sefland, politician
16 May – Stein Mehren, poet, novelist, essayist and playwright
27 May – Karen-Christine Friele, gay rights activist
31 May – Liv Thorsen, actress
1 June – Jacqueline Naze Tjøtta, mathematician (died 2017).
14 June – Kirsten Sødal, author
19 June – Arne Haugestad, Supreme Court lawyer (died 2008).

July to September
8 July – Roar Johansen, international soccer player
30 July – Jens Kristian Thune, barrister (died 2018).
9 August – Leif Ryvarden, mycologist
4 September – Frid Ingulstad, novelist
11 September – Bjørg Vik, writer, playwright and journalist
17 September – Einar Østby, cross country skier and Olympic silver medallist

October to December
8 October – Thorvald Mellingen, engineer
15 November – Stein Ørnhøi, politician
25 November – Kåre Harila, politician
17 December – Nils Olav Totland, politician and Minister
30 December – Sjur Refsdal, astrophysicist

Deaths
19 January – Martin Olsen Nalum, politician and Minister (born 1854)
15 February – Johan Gjøstein, educator, newspaper editor and politician (born 1866)
23 February – Anders Venger, politician and Minister (born 1872)
8 March – Thorolf Holmboe, painter (born 1866)
13 May – Johan Wilhelm Normann Munthe, soldier and art collector (born 1864)
19 June – Harald Sohlberg, painter (born 1869)
24 July – Birger Brodtkorb, track and field athlete (born 1891)
26 July – Gil Andersen, motor racing driver in America (born 1879)
17 August – Johan Martin Jakobsen Strand, farmer and politician (born 1873)
3 September – Jens Tvedt, novelist and short story writer (born 1857)
7 September – Per Winge, conductor, pianist and composer (born 1858)
19 October – Oda Krohg, painter (born 1860)
4 December – Johan Halvorsen, composer, conductor and violinist (born 1864)

See also

References

External links

 
Norway